Tal-y-bont (also known as Talybont) is a village in Ceredigion, Wales, located on the A487 road about halfway between Aberystwyth and Machynlleth. At the 2011 census the population was 662 with 63% born in Wales. Tal-y-bont is in the community of Ceulanamaesmawr.

History
The village stands on the Afon Leri and the Afon Ceulan in the area of Genau'r Glyn, at the foot of Ceulan Maes-mawr. There are old silver and lead mines and woolen mills surrounding the village. Although silver and lead had been mined in the area since Roman times, it was not until the 19th century that the village began to grow dramatically; the terraces were built during this period for workers who migrated to the area. Many of the houses, for example, the pharmacy, are listed buildings and maintain original features such as sliding sash windows. There were only 35 houses in Tal-y-bont in 1835; the majority were thatched roof cottages.

At one time, there were 15 shops, a garage, two banks and three Nonconformist chapels. The Tabernacl was built in 1812, Eglwys Dewi Sant (St David's Church) was built in 1909, and there is a Bethel, Capel yr Annibynwyr (Independent chapel). The Memorial Hall was officially opened on 6 August 1924 in remembrance of those who died during the First World War. Since 1966 the village has been home to Y Lolfa printers and publishers, which is a local employer, as well as to a garage, a pharmacy, a hairdresser and a SPAR convenience store.

There are two pubs in Tal-y-bont, Y Llew Gwyn (The White Lion) and Y Llew Du (The Black Lion). The Tal-y-bont annual agricultural show has been held in the Black Lion's old fields for several decades.

The village was briefly served by Tal-y-bont railway station on the Plynlimon and Hafan Tramway.

The village was twinned with Woodbridge near Ipswich, Suffolk in 1922.

Notable residents
 Lewis Thomas, (1832-1913), known as 'The Coal King of Queensland', Australia
 David Adams (1845–1922), a Congregationalist minister and schoolmaster. 
 John James Williams (1869 in Taigwynion – 1954), a Welsh poet and Archdruid of the National Eisteddfod from 1936 to 1939.
 Thomas Richards MA, D.Litt., F.R.Hist.S (1878–1962), a Welsh historian, author and librarian.
 Mihangel Morgan (born 1955), novelist, lives near the village
 Ruth Jên (born 1964), a Welsh artist, works in the old shoe shop in the village, painted the Y Lolfa mural
 Dewi Jenkins, (born circa 1975), sheepdog trials Supreme Champion.

Gallery

References

External links

 tal-y-bont.org This has been hijacked by what appears to be a Japanese page.
 www.geograph.co.uk: photos of Tal-y-bont and surrounding area
 papurpawb.com
 www.ylolfa.com 

Villages in Ceredigion